Hon is an unincorporated community in Scott County, Arkansas, United States.

History
The community was named after the family of John Hon, which settled the area in the 1830s.  A post office called Hon was established in 1904, and remained in operation until 1973.

References

Unincorporated communities in Scott County, Arkansas
Unincorporated communities in Arkansas